Mije may refer to:
 Mije people, an ethnic group of Mexico
 Mije languages, the languages spoken by them
 Mije (wrestler) (born 1969), Mexican wrestler
 Antonio Mije (1095–1076), Spanish politician
 , a village in Dohuk Governorate, Iraq

See also 
 Miji (disambiguation)